The term Junior Minister, in Northern Ireland, is the name given to two positions in the Executive Office, a department in the Northern Ireland Executive answerable to the First Minister and deputy First Minister.

The positions are currently vacant.

Under the Northern Ireland Act 1998, the First Minister and Deputy First Minister acting jointly may determine that a number of members of the Northern Ireland Assembly shall be appointed as junior ministers.

The salary of each junior minister in 2007–2008 (when devolution was restored) was £60,067.42, which decreased to the current level of £55,000.00 in 2016.

The Social Democratic and Labour Party (SDLP) called for the immediate abolition of the junior minister positions in its 2011 Northern Ireland Assembly election manifesto.

Junior Ministers

Nominated by the First Minister

Nominated by the Deputy First Minister

Assembly Private Secretary 

Following the 2011 Northern Ireland Assembly election, First Minister Peter Robinson and Deputy First Minister Martin McGuinness announced the creation of the new post of Assembly Private Secretary, available to all ministers in the Northern Ireland Executive.

The position is similar to that of a parliamentary private secretary in the House of Commons, providing political support to the Minister within the department.  It is non-salaried and held by a backbencher from the same party as the Minister.  While not ministerial, and therefore below the rank of Junior Minister, it provides experience to members considered as potential future ministers.  It is not compulsory to appoint an Assembly Private Secretary; indeed the Alliance Party of Northern Ireland initially did not make appointments.

As of May 2011, OFMDFM officials were drawing up a code of conduct and enabling processes to facilitate the creation of the posts. None had been published by October 2011, meaning that the posts had not been created by the Northern Ireland Assembly up to that point.  However, they were declared as public offices in the register of members' interests on 29 June 2011 and 7 October 2011.

The prospective Assembly Private Secretaries are:

Democratic Unionist Party 
Paul Girvan MLA (OFMDFM)
Alastair Ross MLA (Department of Enterprise, Trade and Investment)
Simon Hamilton MLA (Department of Finance and Personnel)
Alex Easton MLA (Department of Health, Social Services and Public Safety)
William Humphrey MLA (Department for Social Development)

Sinn Féin
Pat Doherty MP MLA (Department of Agriculture and Rural Development)
Barry McElduff MLA (Department of Culture, Arts and Leisure)
Mitchel McLaughlin MLA (Department of Education)

Sinn Féin has adopted the term Parliamentary Under Secretary to describe the position.

Ulster Unionist Party
Danny Kinahan MLA (Department for Regional Development)

Social Democratic and Labour Party
Colum Eastwood MLA (Department of the Environment)

See also 
 Executive Office (Northern Ireland)
 First Minister and deputy First Minister of Northern Ireland
 List of government ministers in Northern Ireland

References

External links 
 Executive Office

Northern Ireland Executive